Karl-Erivan Haub (March 2, 1960 – disappeared April 7, 2018) was a German-American-Russian billionaire businessman, and the managing director and part owner of Tengelmann Group. He disappeared while mountaineering on April 7, 2018, and was legally declared dead by a German court in May 2021.

Life and family
Karl-Erivan Haub was born on March 2, 1960, in Tacoma, Washington. He was the oldest son of Erivan Haub, the former CEO of Tengelmann Group. From 1978 to 1983, Haub studied economics and social sciences at the University of St. Gallen, Switzerland. At the same time, he was a trainee at Tengelmann Group.

According to Forbes, the Haub family is one of the wealthiest in the world.

Disappearance
Haub was an experienced ski mountaineer. On April 7, 2018, he went training for a skiing tour in Zermatt, Switzerland and did not return, thus being reported as missing. Reportedly, he intended to take part in the Patrouille des Glaciers, the world's biggest ski touring race which starts in Zermatt (respectively in the valley to the west, Arolla), and ends in Verbier. He had been taking part in this 53 km long race for several years.

Following his disappearance, Tengelmann announced that his brother Christian W.E. Haub would be appointed sole CEO of Tengelmann Group effective April 18, 2018.

A week after he went missing, the search was called off and Haub is now presumed dead.

In October 2018, the search was discontinued due to lack of prospects of success.

On May 14, 2021, the district court in Cologne formally declared Haub dead, officially listing his time of death as midnight on April 7, 2018.

Career
Haub worked for Nestlé and McKinsey & Company before joining Tengelmann again. In 2000, Haub became CEO of Tengelmann Group.

See also
 List of people who disappeared

References

1960 births
2010s missing person cases
American billionaires
American people of German descent
Businesspeople from Tacoma, Washington
Karl-Erivan
Missing people
Missing person cases in Switzerland
University of St. Gallen alumni